Jam Session is a live album by trumpeters Clifford Brown, Clark Terry, and Maynard Ferguson featuring tracks recorded in early 1954 and released on the EmArcy label. The album was recorded at the same session that produced Dinah Washington's Dinah Jams.

Reception 

Billboard in 1955 wrote: "Good as all the sidemen are, it's the three trumpets which walk off with top honors. Recording is excellent." AllMusic awarded the album 4½ stars and Scott Yanow, in his review, calls it "A brilliant set that is highly recommended".

Track listing 
 "What Is This Thing Called Love?" (Cole Porter) – 14:56   
 "Darn That Dream" (Eddie DeLange, Jimmy Van Heusen) – 5:16   
 "Move" (Denzil Best) – 14:28   
 "My Funny Valentine/Don't Worry 'bout Me/Bess, You Is My Woman Now/It Might as Well Be Spring" (Lorenz Hart, Richard Rodgers/Rube Bloom, Ted Koehler/George Gershwin, Ira Gershwin/Oscar Hammerstein II, Rogers) – 11:29

Personnel 
Clifford Brown, Maynard Ferguson, Clark Terry – trumpet
Herb Geller – alto saxophone (tracks 1, 3 & 4)
Harold Land – tenor saxophone 
Junior Mance – piano (tracks 1, 3 & 4)
Richie Powell – piano (track 2)
Keter Betts, George Morrow – bass
Max Roach – drums
Dinah Washington – vocals (track 2)

References 

1955 live albums
Clifford Brown albums
Clark Terry albums
Maynard Ferguson albums
EmArcy Records live albums